German submarine U-1062 was one of a series of four Type VIIF submarine of Nazi Germany's Kriegsmarine during World War II.

U-1062 was one of four Type VIIF torpedo transport submarines, which could carry up to 40 torpedoes, and were used to re-supply other U-boats at sea. U-1062 commissioned on 19 June 1943, first served with 5th U-boat Flotilla for training and later served with 12th U-boat Flotilla from 1 January until 30 September 1944.

Design
As one of the four German Type VIIF submarines, U-1062 had a displacement of  when at the surface and  while submerged. She had two shafts and two  propellers.

U-1062 was fitted with five  torpedo tubes (four fitted at the bow and one at the stern), fourteen torpedoes, one  SK C/35 naval gun, 220 rounds, and various anti-aircraft guns. The boat had a complement of about forty-six.

Service history

U-1062 left Kiel on 18 December 1943, arriving at Bergen on 24 December, where she remained until 3 January 1944, when she sailed for Penang, arriving on 19 April, loaded with spare torpedoes for the Monsun Gruppe. She left Penang on 15 July to return to Germany, but was intercepted on 30 September by a hunter-killer group based around the escort carrier  in the central Atlantic, WSW of the Cape Verde Islands.

References

Bibliography

External links

German Type VIIF submarines
U-boats commissioned in 1943
U-boats sunk in 1944
World War II submarines of Germany
Indian Ocean U-Boats
1943 ships
World War II shipwrecks in the Atlantic Ocean
Ships built in Kiel
U-boats sunk by depth charges
U-boats sunk by US warships
Ships lost with all hands
Maritime incidents in September 1944